Pedal Heaven Race Team is a professional men's cycling team based in Great Britain, which competes in elite road bicycle racing events under UCI Continental rules.

Major wins
2014
Imperial Winter Series 7 (Hillingdon), Jake Martin
South of England Road Championships, Alex Paton
Hillingdon Grand Prix, Alex Paton
Ottershaw Series 1, Lewis Atkins
Ottershaw Series 2, Lewis Atkins
Ottershaw Series 3, Lewis Atkins
Durham University Cyclo Cross, Alex Paton
2015
Evesham Vale RR, Dave McGowan
March Hare Classic, Rory Townsend
Peter Young Memorial RR, Rory Townsend
BUCS Road Race Championship, Rory Townsend
Guildford Criterium, Alex Paton
Stage 2 Suir Valley, David McGowan
South East Divisional Championships, Rob Moore
Welsh Road Championships, Stevie Williams
2016
East and South-East Regional Cyclocross Championships (Senior Men), Alex Paton
Tour of Al Zubarah (UCI 2.2, Prologue (ITT)), Jacob Tipper
Perfs Pedal RR, Rory Townsend
BUCS Road Race Championships, Harry Tanfield 
Roy Thame Cup, Matthew Clarke (Excel Academy)
Jim Rogers Memorial RR, James Gullen
Evesham Vale RR, Jacob Tipper
SERRL Summer Series #3, Will Harper (Excel Academy)
2nd Jock Wadley Memorial RR, Lloyd Chapman
Duncan Sparrow RR, James Gullen
Wally Gimber Trophy, Lloyd Chapman
3rd Chorley Grand Prix, Dexter Gardias

Team roster

Excel Academy team

The Excel Academy team is a feeder team running in parallel to the UCI Continental team, with its own dedicated race calendar and plan enabling ambitious riders to develop with the support of more experienced team members.

Cycling teams based in the United Kingdom
UCI Continental Teams (Europe)
Cycling teams established in 2014
2014 establishments in the United Kingdom